Ashland High School is a public high school in Ashland, Kansas, United States, and operated by Unified School District 220.  It competes within the KSHSAA 1A classification, it operates on a four-day school week, its teachers are on a 166-day contract, and a 96% attendance rate and 95-100% graduation rate has been accomplished. The school mascot is the Blue Jay, the school colors are blue and white.

History
Former principal G.N. Gould made fossil discoveries of a prehistoric "serpent" (Plesiosaurus) in a canyon where additional finds followed.

In 1911 the Kansas High School Debating League was won by Fred Hinkle, Cale Carson, and Clarence Bare of Ashland High School.

In 1943 students helped build a livestock squeeze. The school has about 65 students.

See also

 List of high schools in Kansas
 List of unified school districts in Kansas

References

External links
 USD 220

Public high schools in Kansas
Clark County, Kansas